Aedes (Ochlerotatus) wardi is a species complex of zoophilic mosquito belonging to the genus Aedes. It is found in Sri Lanka, Malaysia, Philippines and Indonesia.

References

External links
Taxonomy - Ochlerotatus wardi (SPECIES) - UniProt

wardi